The 1981 National Invitation Tournament was the 1981 edition of the annual NCAA college basketball competition.

Selected teams
Below is a list of the 32 teams selected for the tournament.

 Alabama
 American
 Clemson
 Connecticut
 Dayton
 Drake
 Duke
 Duquesne
 Fordham
 Georgia
 Holy Cross
 Marquette
 Michigan
 Minnesota
 North Carolina A&T
 Old Dominion
 Pan American
 Penn
 Purdue
 Rhode Island
 St. John's
 San Jose State
 South Alabama
 South Florida
 Southern Miss
 Syracuse
 Temple
 Texas–Arlington
 Toledo
 Tulsa
 UTEP
 West Virginia

Bracket

Below are the four first round brackets, along with the four-team championship bracket.

Semifinals & finals

See also
 1981 NCAA Division I basketball tournament
 1981 NCAA Division II basketball tournament
 1981 NCAA Division III basketball tournament
 1981 NAIA Division I men's basketball tournament
 1981 NAIA Division I women's basketball tournament
 1981 National Women's Invitational Tournament

References

National Invitation
National Invitation Tournament
1980s in Manhattan
Basketball in New York City
College sports in New York City
Madison Square Garden
National Invitation Tournament
National Invitation Tournament
Sports competitions in New York City
Sports in Manhattan